Além do Tempo (English title: Time After Time) is a Brazilian telenovela that premiered on 13 July 2015 and ended 15 January 2016. It is created by Elizabeth Jhin. Written by Elizabeth
Jhin in conjunction with Eliane Garcia, Lílian Garcia, Duba Elia, Vinícius Vianna, Wagner de Assis and Renata Jhin; Além do Tempo is directed by Pedro Vasconcellos and Rogério Gomes. Starring Alinne Moraes, Rafael Cardoso, Paolla Oliveira, Ana Beatriz Nogueira, Emilio Dantas, Irene Ravache, Letícia Persiles and Júlia Lemmertz.

Plot

First phase: Campobello 
The first phase happens in the 19 century and portrays the history of an improbable love but so strong, that neither death nor time is capable to shake. Lívia and Felipe are of distinct social classes: She is a humble, obliged young lady that lives in the city's convent while Felipe is a noble Earl, nephew-grandson of the powerful Countess Vitória. He is about to walk down the aisle with the beautiful Melissa.

Lívia and Felipe fall passionately in love at first sight. To live this passion seems impossible. Beyond the commitment of the Earl, Lívia discovers that she is granddaughter of a Countess, a greatest enemy to her mother, who provoked her separation to Bernardo, the only son to the nobleman. Vitória does not accept the love that its heir felt for the artist mambembe, until it decides to live with the loved one and to open hand of all its wealth.

Despaired with the attitude of her son, the Countess sends a letter to Emília saying that she is willing to accept her as a daughter-in-law. Bernardo distrusts of the good intentions of her mother and goes to find Emília by himself. A great tragedy occur's on the way, and Bernardo dies. The first phase ends with Felipe and Lívia drowning making love oaths.

Second phase: Belarrosa 
150 years later, all the people of Campobello, now Belarrosa, will have a second chance to redeem the errors of the past. Felipe Santarém, humble owner of a Vinícola Campobello, and Lívia Beraldini, a cultured, rich and educated young woman, will have a new possibility to live their love. Lívia is daughter to Emília, with whom they do not share a good relationship. She is also engaged to Pedro, a possessive and jealousy man. Felipe is already married to Melissa and they are parents to Alex. Melissa is a dedicated wife and left her dreams aside for Felipe despite the sorrow she caused her mother, Dorotéia. She will disclose her true colours when she discovers the love between Lívia and Felipe.

The new phase also shows the conflicts of Emília with her mother, Vitória Ventura. While a child, Emília lived in a small town in South of Italy with her mother and father, Alberto Navona. In her seventh birthday, she was abandoned by her mother and this left her traumatized. With regrets, Vitória comes back to ask for forgiveness, but her father (Alberto) fakes his death to avenge the fact that his wife ran away with another man. Now rich and powerful, Emília is owner to the Beraldini House - a company that imports wines hosted in Rio de Janeiro. On the other hand, Vitória is through a financial crisis thus decides to put her house in Belarrosa and the Vinícola Ventura on sale in order to pay her debts. For vengeance, Emília  buys all her mother's properties without Vitória's knowledge that the purchaser is her own daughter and that she plans to disinherit her from the patrimony.

Cast

First phase

Second phase

Soundtrack 

The official soundtrack of Além do Tempo was released on 11 September 2015 in CD and digital download formats. The cover had the protagonists Alinne Moraes and Rafael Cardoso on it. "Palavras ao Vento" by Cássia Eller directed by Rogério Gomes which is also the opening theme song was among the singles in the album.

]

Reception

Ratings 
Time After Time was a hit with Brazilian audiences, reaching over 173 million viewers and making a big impression on social media. The show had a total of 654,000 comments online, averaging 5,000 comments per episode.

Awards and nominations

References

External links 
 

2015 telenovelas
TV Globo telenovelas
Brazilian telenovelas
2015 Brazilian television series debuts
2016 Brazilian television series endings
Portuguese-language telenovelas
Telenovelas about spiritism